Belcan, LLC is a global supplier of engineering, supply chain, technical recruiting and information technology (IT) services to customers in the aerospace, defense, automotive, industrial and government sectors.  Headquartered in Cincinnati, Ohio, Belcan has over 10,000 employees in 50 locations around the world.

History
Belcan Corporation was founded in 1958 by Ralph G. Anderson, an engineering graduate of the University of Kentucky. Until 1976, Belcan concentrated on providing temporary engineering services to companies such as Allison Engine Company, General Electric, Pratt & Whitney and Procter & Gamble.

In 1976 Belcan began to offer outsourced engineering services, hiring permanent engineering staff and performing engineering projects for clients in Belcan's offices. Separate divisions were formed: Engineering for outsourced engineering, and TechServices for temporary engineering services. Procter & Gamble was one of the first major customers of Belcan's in-house services. Beginning in 1976, Belcan began opening TechServices offices throughout the U.S.

In 1983, Belcan was offered a contract by Procter & Gamble to upgrade the production lines for a redesign of their Pampers disposable diapers. Belcan was responsible for the design, procurement, installation, commissioning and training of operations and maintenance personnel for production lines in 4 U.S. plants and seven overseas plants. Belcan expanded their offices and increased staff up to 400 people in order to meet the schedule. The first production line was running 7 months after the start of the project.

In 1987, Belcan formed the Specialty Equipment Engineering Division to service light bulb manufacturing for all of General Electric's worldwide manufacturing plants. SEED subsequently expanded to provide design and build of specialized manufacturing equipment for numerous clients and industries.

In 1991, Belcan and General Electric Aviation formed an alliance for Belcan to provide engineering, design and test support for GE's turbine engines. This relationship continued to grow, and in 2006 GE awarded Belcan a "Super Center" contract to provide support to GE's Aviation, Energy, Oil & Gas, Transportation and Water divisions.

The Staffing Solutions division of Belcan was founded in 1989 to address current customers' light industrial and clerical staffing needs. It had grown to over 25 offices in over 12 states before the division was spun off as Belflex and is no longer a part of Belcan.

Belcan's Engineering and TechServices divisions expanded through the late 1990s to the present with new offices and acquisitions. By 2009 Belcan had approximately 60 offices internationally. On July 13, 2015, AE Industrial Partners LLC announced that it had completed the acquisition of Belcan Corporation. That acquisition began a series of events resulting in growth and diversification of services. Belcan expanded with offerings in five industry segments: Engineering & Design, Manufacturing & Supply Chain, Systems & Software, Technical Recruiting and Government Services.

Services
Belcan provides services in the following areas:

Engineering Services
Belcan's Engineering Services division has 3,500 engineers in 25 offices providing full-service engineering support to clients in the Aviation, Energy, Heavy Equipment, Transportation, Marine, Medical and Consumer & Industrial Products industries. Capabilities include design engineering, engineering analysis (such as finite element analysis and computational fluid dynamics), design drafting, software, electronics and control systems, systems engineering, manufacturing engineering, customer service engineering and project management.

Technical Services
Belcan's Technical Services division provides contract personnel and direct hire recruiting of technical professionals across multiple industries, as well as IT infrastructure solutions and services to government and commercial clients.

Recent Acquisitions 

 Tandel Systems, Inc., January 2016
 East Kilbride Engineering Services (EKES), February 2016
 Intercom Consulting & Federal Systems, June 2016
 The Kemtah Group Incorporated, January 2017
 CDI Corporation’s Aerospace Assets, December 2017
 Allegiant International, June 2018
 Omega Engineering Services, July 2018
Sitec Design Ltd. and Sitec Recruitment Ltd., February 2019
Lagoni Engineering, September 2019
Base2 Solutions, December 2019
Telesis Corporation, November 2020
AVISTA, Inc., November 2020
VICTOR42, May 2021
RTM Consulting, September 2022

Notes

References

External links
Belcan 

Engineering companies of the United States
Companies based in Cincinnati
Privately held companies based in Ohio
Consulting firms established in 1958
1958 establishments in Ohio